Maconie is a surname. Notable people with the surname include:

Kat Maconie, American footwear designer
Robin Maconie (born 1942), New Zealand composer, pianist, and writer
Stuart Maconie (born 1960), English radio DJ, television presenter, writer, music critic, and journalist